The Militia Immaculatae (meaning the "Army of the Immaculate One"), called in English the Knights of the Immaculata, is a worldwide Catholic evangelization movement founded by St. Maximilian Kolbe in 1917.

History
The Militia of the Immaculata (or MI) was founded in Rome at the "St. Bonaventure" Pontifical Theological Faculty (now the International College of the Conventual Franciscans) by a Conventual Franciscan, Father Maximilian Kolbe. The MI is open to all Catholics and encourages intercession to the Virgin Mary for the conversion of sinners.

Kolbe presented the idea of forming the MI to his Jesuit spiritual director, as well as to his Franciscan Superior at the house of studies in Rome, and was encouraged to proceed. The purpose of the MI is to draw souls back to the knowledge and importance of the Immaculate Conception of the Blessed Virgin Mary, and to how every soul can easily enter into this consoling mystery through their own personal Act of Consecration to the Immaculata.

It was established as a pious union on January 2, 1922, by the Vicariate of Rome.

Joining the MI involves making a personal act of consecration to Mary. Members wear the Miraculous Medal as an outward sign of their consecration.

The purpose of the Knights is contained in these words: to do all you can for the conversion of sinners, heretics, schismatics and so on, above all the Masons, and for the sanctification of all persons under the sponsorship of the Blessed Virgin Mary, the Immaculate Mediatrix. - Fr. Maximilian Kolbe, 1938.

The association grew and spread to different countries. On October 16, 1997, the Pontifical Council for the Laity decreed the "Milizia dell'Immacolata" to be an international association of the faithful of pontifical right. MI has over 3 million members in 48 countries.

The organization publishes Miles Immaculatae, a six-monthly magazine of Marian culture and Kolbian formation. Founded by St. Maximilian Kolbe, specifically for priests and pastoral workers, it is now the official publication of the International Center.

See also
Immaculate Conception
Immaculata prayer
Niepokalanów
Catholic Marian movements and societies

References

Bibliography
 Smith, Jeremiah J., Saint Maximilian Kolbe: Knight of the Immaculata, 2008 
 Manteau-Bonamy, H. M., Immaculate Conception and the Holy Spirit: The Marian Teachings of St. Maximilian Kolbe, 2008

External links
 Militia Immaculata International Website

Christian organizations established in 1917
Catholic organizations established in the 20th century
Catholic Mariology
Catholic orders and societies
International associations of the faithful
Order of Friars Minor Conventual